The Flattop Site is a prehistoric location situated within the boundaries of the Petrified Forest National Park, near Adamana, Arizona. The site was inhabited by the Basketmaker II culture from approximately 1-300 AD. In 1949–1950 the site, consisting of roughly 25 pit-houses, was excavated by Fred Wendorf. Among the objects excavated were about fourteen projectile points. In 1953 Wendorf again excavated the site, revealing "Adamana brown" pottery, a plain brown pottery from the Basketmaker III culture.

See also
 
 
 National Register of Historic Places listings in Apache County, Arizona
 National Register of Historic Places listings in Petrified Forest National Park

References

National Register of Historic Places in Apache County, Arizona
Historic sites in Arizona
National Register of Historic Places in Petrified Forest National Park
Ancient Puebloan archaeological sites in Arizona